These are the results for the 2005 edition of La Flèche Wallonne cycling classic, won by Danilo Di Luca from Italy.

General Standings

20-04-2005: Charleroi-Huy, 201.5 km.

External links
Race website

2005 in road cycling
2005 UCI ProTour
2005
April 2005 sports events in Europe